Scheune is German for "barn" and may refer to:

Scheune, the German name of Gumieńce, Stettin, in Poland
Blaue Scheune, an art gallery in an old barn on the German island of Hiddensee
Scheune Bollewick,  ahistoric barn in the German county of Mecklenburgische Seenplatte 
Die Scheune textile museum, Nettetal, Germany
Scheune (Dresden), a cultural centre in Dresden